The 1985–86 South Midlands League season was 57th in the history of South Midlands League.

Premier Division

The Premier Division featured 13 clubs which competed in the division last season, along with 3 new clubs, promoted from last season's Division One: 
Milton Keynes Borough
Langford
Cranfield United

League table

Division One

The Division One featured 10 clubs which competed in the division last season, along with 2 new clubs:
Brache Sparta, relegated from Premier Division
Buckingham Athletic, joined from North Bucks League

League table

References

1985–86
8